N'Dea Davenport is the self-titled studio album by American singer and songwriter N'Dea Davenport, released on June 30, 1998, by V2 Records. The album peaked at number 56 on the Billboard R&B Albums chart and number 14 on the Heatseekers Albums chart.

Background
After defecting from The Brand New Heavies in 1995, Davenport signed with V2 Records and began recording her first album in 1996. The album features music production from Dallas Austin and Daniel Lanois. The lead single "Bring It On" charted number 75 on the Billboard Hot R&B Songs chart. Following the album's release, Davenport released three more singles: "Bullshittin'", "Underneath a Red Moon", "Whatever You Want". In addition to promoting the album, Davenport performed at the Lilith Fair in 1998.

Track listing
 "Whatever You Want" (N'Dea Davenport, Glen Patscha) - 4:31
 "Underneath a Red Moon" (Davenport, Colin Wolfe) - 4:16
 "Save Your Love for Me" (Davenport, Damon Malone) - 4:07
 "When the Night Falls" (Davenport, Patscha) - 4:50
 "Bring It On" (Davenport, Dallas Austin, Brady Blade, Wolfe) - 4:22
 "No Never Again" (Davenport, Austin) - 5:14
 "In Wonder" (Davenport) - 4:06
 "Bullshittin'" (Davenport, Blade) - 3:34
 "Real Life" (Davenport, Daniel Lanois) - 3:06; feat. Daniel Lanois
 "Old Man" (Neil Young) - 4:00
 "Placement for the Baby" (Davenport, Paul Powell) - 6:25
 "Oh Mother Earth (Embrace)" (Davenport, Austin) - 3:52
 "Getaway" (Davenport) - 3:30; featuring the Rebirth Brass Band
 Additional track on double LP release:
14. "Bullshittin' (B.S.'n...)" (Davenport, Blade, Mos Def) - 4:18;  featuring Mos Def

Personnel
N'Dea Davenport - vocals, grand piano, Omnichord, tambourine
Doyle Bramhall II, Tomi Martin, Buddy Miller, Daniel Lanois - electric guitar
James LeBlanc - electric guitar, steel guitar
Paul Powell - guitar, synthesizer, drums
Derwin Perkins - rhythm guitar
Al Berry, Daryl Johnson, Robby Emerson - bass guitar
Colin Wolfe - bass guitar, keyboards
Glenn Patscha, Dallas Austin, Duane Dupry - keyboards
Tom Knight, Brady Blade - drums
E.J. Rodriguez - percussion
Paul Shapiro - saxophone, flute
Darrell Mims - flute
Dan Levine - trombone
Bob Brockmann - flugelhorn
Eric Freidlander - cello

Charts

References

1998 debut albums
N'Dea Davenport albums
Albums produced by Dallas Austin
Albums produced by Daniel Lanois
V2 Records albums